Théodore Juste (11 January 1818 in Brussels – 10 August 1888 in Saint-Gilles) was a Belgian historian and literary scholar. He became curator of the Musée royal d'antiquités, d'armures et d'artillerie in 1859.

Works
 Histoire élémentaire et populaire de la Belgique, 1838.
 Précis de l'histoire moderne considérée dans ses rapports avec la Belgique, 1845.
 Histoire de la révolution Belge de 1790, 1848.
 Histoire du Congrès national de Belgique, ou de la fondation de la monarchie belge, 1850 (online text).
 Les Pays-Bas sous Philippe II, 1855.
 Christine de Lalaing, princesse d'Epinoy, 1861.
 Les Pays-Bas sous Charles-Quint: vie de Marie de Hongrie, 1861
 Souvenirs Diplomatique du XVIIIe siècle, 1863.
 La révolution Belge de 1830, d'après des documents inédits, 1872.

1818 births
1888 deaths
Writers from Brussels
Belgian curators
19th-century Belgian historians
19th-century Belgian male writers